Edvard Ferdinand Linna (26 August 1886 – 30 December 1974) was a Finnish gymnast who won bronze in the 1908 Summer Olympics.

Sport

Gymnastics 

He was also selected to Finland's 1912 Olympic gymnastics team, but dropped out due to an injury.

He won the Finnish national championship in team gymnastics as a member of Ylioppilasvoimistelijat in 1909.

Figure skating 

He won the Finnish figure skating championship in pair skating five times:
 pair Olga Saario: 1924, 1926 and 1927
 pair daughter Hilkka Linna: 1938 and 1939

Other 

He was a founding member of the club Helsingin Luistelijat, and its chairman in 1929–1947.

He was the chairman of the Finnish Figure Skating Association in 1932–1946.

He was a board member of the Finnish Olympic Committee in 1934–1937.

Family 

He finnicized his familyname from Borg to Linna on 23 June 1906. Politically he was a Fennoman.

Successful athletic family members:
 Daughter Hilkka Linna (1919–1956) won two Finnish pair skating championships with him.
 Her granddaughter Liisa Kiuru (1981–) won a junior Finnish and Nordic championship in synchronized skating.
 Daughter Riitta Linna (1922–2016) won a Finnish figure skating championship.
 Daughter Kirsti Linna (1926–) won five Finnish figure skating championships.

References 

1886 births
1974 deaths
Finnish male artistic gymnasts
Gymnasts at the 1908 Summer Olympics
Olympic gymnasts of Finland
Olympic bronze medalists for Finland
Olympic medalists in gymnastics
Finnish pair skaters

Medalists at the 1908 Summer Olympics
People from Mikkeli Province (Grand Duchy of Finland)